The Same Side is the second studio album by the British singer-songwriter Lucie Silvas. It was first released on 20 October 2006 in the Netherlands. It was scheduled for release at the same time in Silvas' native UK, but was postponed after the failure of the album's first single "Last Year". The album was released in the UK on 12 March 2007. The album debuted in the Dutch Albums Chart at number 5, though only peaked at 62 in the UK.

Album information
The Dutch edition of the album includes the song "Everytime I Think of You", a duet with Dutch singer Marco Borsato, as the 12th track of the album with "Stolen" as a hidden track.

Singles 
"Everytime I Think of You" was released as the first single in the Netherlands. It charted within the Dutch Top 40 at number 35 on downloads only, before rising to Number 1 the following week.

The first UK single (and second single for the Netherlands) was "Last Year". It failed to reach the UK Top 100, prompting Silvas' record company to postpone the UK release of the album for several months.

A second single, "Sinking In", was released as a 'download only' single in the UK, though this failed to chart.

Track listing

B-sides

Chart performance

References

Lucie Silvas albums
2006 albums